Saikwan  or Xiguan is an ancient town and an area in the Liwan district of Guangzhou, China, which was located west of the old walled city. The Thirteen Factories trading enclave was located on its southern shore and the Shamian enclave was constructed beside it. Xiguan continues to have a distinctive culture within Guangzhou and some residents speak a distinctive dialect of Cantonese.

It now forms most of Liwan District.

Name 
Before the 20th century, Guangzhou was a walled city with many gates. Its western gates included the Taiping Gate  Tàipíngmén;  . "Gate of Great Peace") and the West Gate  Zhengximén, . "Straight Western Gate"). It was formerly the area's more common English name, although Mandarin pinyin is now the official form within China. It was also sometimes simply translated as "Westgate" or the "western suburbs" of Guangzhou (formerly known as "Canton").

"Xiguan" or "New Xiguan") is also an informal name for Guangzhou's Liwan District.

Geography
Old Xiguan covered most of the present Liwan District, excluding Xicun  Xīcūn;  . "West Village") Lychee Bay, and the old Fangcun District. It ran along the Pearl River from the 1st Quay (p Diyī Jin, j Dai6-jat1 Zeon1) in the northwest to the outlet of the western moat (p Xīháo, j Sai1-hou4) in the southeast. This "creek" formed the eastern boundary of the Thirteen Factories and separated Xiguan from Nanguan, the old city's southern suburb and Chinese dockyards. The foreign enclave on Shamian Island was usually excluded from Xiguan but Huangsha (p Huángshā, j Wong4*2-saa1, . "Yellow Sands") was usually included.

In modern Guangzhou, the preservation district of Xiguan is formally defined as follows:

History
The suburbs outside Guangzhou's Taiping Gate came to be called "Xiguan" during the Ming dynasty (14th17th century). Over time, they expanded to fill the fields between the walled city and the Pearl River. The area was administered as part of Nanhai County. It was known for its loveliness. On 15 February 1921, Xiguan was removed from Nanhai County and united with Guangfu to form an enlarged Guangzhou. On 27 October 2006, the Liwan District Government approved a preservation plan for Xiguan's traditional architecture and culture.

Culture 

Apart from its connection to Guangdong's Lingnan and Cantonese culture, Xiguan is famed within China as the site of "Western Learning Spreading East" (zh:西學東漸, p Xīxué Dōng Jiān, j Sai1 Hok6 Dung1 Zim1) There are varieties of customs in Xiguan, which are comparatively well conserved among districts in Guangzhou. Customs during the Chinese New Year, on Tomb Sweeping Day and Chinese Valentine's Day, during the Mid-Autumn Festival, and at the Winter Solstice are more or less the same as those in other places in Guangzhou. During the Dragon Boat Festival, some male residents row dragon boats.

The area's culture is celebrated in Dongshan Shaoye's song "Miss Xiguan" (Xiguan Xiaojie, j Sai1-gwaan1 Siu2-ze2) and Liao Weili's album Xiguan. Xiguan is the setting of the mainland Chinese dramas Exotic Wives and Local Husbands (Wailai Xifu Bendi Lang, j Ngoi6-loi4 Sik1-fu5 Bun2-dei6-long4) and Turbulent Xiguan (Fengyu Xiguan, j Fung1-jyu5 Sai1-gwaan1) and the Hong Kong dramas Point of No Return (2003) and When Easterly Showers Fall on the Sunny West (2008).

Architecture

Xiguan Residences, which used to be the residences of wealthy businessmen, are the typical representative of vernacular dwellings in Xiguan.

Zhutong ("Bamboo Tube") Houses are traditional houses that are rich in characteristics of Lingnan (a geographical area referring to lands in the south of China's "Five Ranges" which are Tayu, Qitian, Dupang, Mengzhu, Yuecheng. This region covers the Guangdong, Guangxi, Hunan and Jiangxi provinces of modern China and northern Vietnam). They are relatively cruder and narrower than a Xi guan (West Customs) house. The width of this type of house is short and the depth is long; the W/L ratio varies from 1:4 to 1:8. The rooms are arranged from front to back with skylights as intervals thus the shape of a bamboo tube. Ventilation, drainage and traffic are mainly dependent on the skylights and the roadway, i.e. the longer the house is, the more skylights are required. They appear to be one story, but since they can reach a height of 4.5 meters, they always set floor levels and stairways within the house. Stones are used to construct the base of a wall and bricks are used as the body of each wall. They always have a gable, a wooden frame and a tiled roof.

Some people claim that arcades in Xiguan correlate closely to the residences of ancient people living in Nanyue. They are considered as the trace of Baiyue stilt house. On the other hand, some people insist that arcades are structures built in 1925 when streets were extended and roads were constructed on a large scale in Guangzhou. Their design is deemed to have derived from ancient Greece. Arcades connect houses and make a long path for pedestrians to keep out wind, rain and the glare of sunshine. Arcades seem to be exactly designed for the climate in Guangzhou and meanwhile makes it much more convenient for stores to display their goods and attract customers. This kind of structure has always been the main feature of Guangzhou's commercial atmosphere and has become the sign of Guangdong Street or Canton Street in other places, such as Jinling Donglu in Shanghai Arcades in Guangzhou first appeared in the area around Sacred Heart Cathedral on Yide Lu. Later, other business quarters in Guangzhou imitated the example such as Shangxiajiu, Zhongshan Lu, Enning Lu and Renmin Nanlu.

Buildings on Shamian can be divided into four categories: New Baroque, Neoclassical, Veranda, and Pseudo-Gothic. During the end of the nineteenth century to early twentieth centuries, along the Changdi ,  . "Long riverbank") and Xidi ,  . "west riverbank") of the Pearl River in Guangzhou, large office and commercial buildings were constructed, which reflected the popular new classical architectural style of the Nineteenth Century Western Countries and have also retained the architectural features of the Grecian and Roman times.

Cuisine
Delicacies which have earned the title of Chinese Famous Food  are as follows: Peanut & Sesame Filled Cake of Ronghua Teahouse), Double skin milk and Milk With Ginger Juice of Nanxin, Shrimp Wonton of Ouchengji, Jidi Congee of Wuzhanji, Ginger Juice & Milk Custard Tart  of Qingping Restaurant), Sweetheart Cake of Lianxianglou Teahouse), Rice Noodle Roll With Beef of Yinji and Goose Liver Boiled Dumplings of Jinzhongge.

The Chinese character Ji 記 is often used in a restaurant's signage, often following the owner's name. For instance, Kaiji is named for its owner Ye Jiankai.

Double-skin milk in Daliang, Shunde owns a most famous reputation. The founder of Nanxin) comes from Shunde, and set up a shop in Guangzhou in 1943.

The name is actually derived from the cookery and taste. When it is cooked, it appears as there are two skins for the milk. Originally in Guangzhou, the most famous one would be Nanxin store, but it's now combined with other famous snack to be sold. It looks as the white jelly and with sweet taste.

Coconut ice cream of Shunji Bingshi is a well-known Xiguan snack. The restaurant was established by a street hawker named Lu Shun in the 1920s. Coconut juice, extracted from fresh coconut meat, diluted milk, eggs and refined white sugar are the ingredients. The delicacies of Shunji have been tasted by heads of foreign states and honored guests such as Norodom Sihanouk from Cambodia in the 1950s and 1960s. Since 1956, the restaurant has acquired the title of Guangzhou Famous Food.

Kaiji) is located on Longjin Donglu. Its owner is Ye Jiankai and he is jokingly called Dousha Kai  (豆沙開) because of the restaurant's food. Kaiji's Tangyuan served with green bean soup  and Vanilla green bean soup clear away diners' heat and toxic material and earn a high reputation in Guangzhou. The shop is Ye's grandfather's legacy.

Shrimp Wonton Noodle  of Ouchengji) is famous. The soup served with this delicacy is the double-stewed soup made of shrimp-roe, flounder and pig bones. Fresh pork, shrimp and eggs are used in stuffing of the wontons. The wonton wrapper is so thin that wontons appear carneous after being cooked thoroughly, thus called glass wontons .

Jidi Congee) of Wuzhanji), alternatively called "Sanyuan Jidi Congee" (三元及第粥), has been famous since Republic of China. Located in Wenchang Xiang, the restaurant is famous for its variety of congee, Jidi the congee in particular. This congee contains dried beancurd stick, gingko and flounder. The congee is also called Sanyuan Jidi Congee for the reason that the numbers of its ingredients in each bowl, namely pork balls, pork liver slices and pork intestine slices correspond respectively to the numbers of Zhuangyuan (狀元), Bangyan (榜眼) and Tanhua (探花). Wuzhanji's Jidi Congee earned the title of Chinese Famous Food  in 1997.

Rice noodle roll (腸粉) was originated by the Hexianguan Restaurant in Pantang) during the Second Sino-Japanese War and it has been a must in Guangzhou's restaurants. Rice noodle roll with beef  of Yinji) is the most famous type. Rice milk is steamed into rice pellicle with meat smash, fillet and pork liver on it and the pellicle is rolled and then cut apart.

Sampan Congee) comes from Lychee Bay. It is called Sampan Congee because it was sold by Tanka people on sampans. Its ingredients used to be only river prawns and slices of fish. Now it has become a commonly seen snack and has gradually become a dish served in restaurants and hotels. Its ingredients are unceasingly updated, with salted jellyfish, peanuts and fried vermicelli.

Education

Elementary schools

 Xiguan Peizheng Primary School
 Xianjidong Primary School
 Sanyuanfang Primary School
 Liuhua Lu Primary School
 Dongfeng Xilu No.1 Primary School
 Dongfeng Xilu No.2 Primary School
 Xihua Lu Primary School
 Xinglong Lu Primary School
 Longjin Xilu Primary School
 Huiyuannan Primary School
 Xilaixi Primary School
 Affiliated Primary School of Guangzhou Normal School
 Liwan Lexianfang Primary School
 Shamian Primary School
 Guangya Li Primary School
 Liwan Baoyuan Zhongyue Primary School
 Wenchang Xiang Primary School
 Baohua Primary School
 Ludixi Primary School
 Mingxing Li Primary School
 Huangsha Dadao Primary School
 Renmin Zhonglu Primary School
 Zhoumen Primary School
 Shuangqiao Primary School
 Liwan Experimental School
 Huancuiyuan Primary School
 Zhongshan Balu Primary School
 Guangya Primary School
 Huanshi Xilu Primary School
 Longjin Primary School
 Baohua Peizheng Primary School
 Liwan Huaqiao Primary School
 Liwan Xihua Lu Primary School
 Zhuji Lu Primary School
 Yaohua Primary School
 Wenchang Primary School
 Jinyan Li Primary School

High schools

 Guangdong Guangya Middle School
 Guangzhou No.4 Middle School
 Guangzhou Vocational School of Early Childhood Education
 Guangzhou No.35 Middle School
 Guangzhou No.31  Middle School
 Guangzhou Xiguan Foreign Language School  (former Middle School )
 Guangzhou No.1 Middle School
 Guangzhou Xiehe Senior School  (former Guangzhou Normal School )
 Guangzhou Meihua Middle School  (former Guangzhou No.59 Middle School )
 Guangzhou No.23 Middle School
 Guangzhou No.36 Middle School
 Guangzhou No.90 Middle School  (emerged into Peiying Middle School )
 Guangzhou Chenjiageng Memorial Middle School  (former Guangzhou No.30 Middle School )
 Guangzhou No.23 Middle School
 Liuhua Middle School
 Guangzhou Nanhai Middle School  (former Guangzhou No.11 Middle School )
 Guangzhou No.69 Middle School  (Closed; afterwards became the campus of Xianjidong Primary School )
 Guangzhou No.24 Middle School
 Xiguan Peiying Middle School
 Guangzhou No.100 Middle School  (emerged into Guangzhou Nanhai Middle School )
 Guangzhou Liwan Middle School  (former Guangzhou No.43 Middle School )

Transportation

Historically, creeks and canals formed the main arteries of transportation in the area. With Guangzhou's urbanization, most of these have been filled and paved or built over. The present area's major roads are Renmin Road in the east on the site of Guangzhou's old moat and city walls, Zhongshan Road in the north, and Dongfeng, Huanshi, 623, Nan'an, and Kangwang Roads and Huangsha Avenue. The Pearl River is crossed by the Zhujiang and Renmin Bridges and the Zhujiang Tunnel.

A local feature are surviving granite streets and lanes, which were used around the Xiguan residences.

Xiguan is well connected to the Guangzhou Metro. Line 1 stops at the Chen Clan Ancestral Hall, Changshou Road, and Huangsha; Line 5 stops at Zhongshanba, Xichang, and Xicun; Line 6 stops at the Cultural Park, Huangsha, and Ruyifang; Line 8 stops at the Chen Hall, Hualin Temple, and Cultural Park; and Line 11 stops at Zhongshanba.

See also 
Liwan District
West Guan Yong
:zh:西關大屋
:zh:西關小姐

Notes

References

Further reading 
People's Government of Liwan District, Guangzhou City
Research Into Cantonese Teaching & Pronunciation (by Mok Chiu Hung, Hong Kong Education Publishing House, 1961 edition)

External links 
Xiguan Accents
Cantonese Association
Cantonese Guild Hall
Cantonese Culture Communication Association

Liwan District